Bath Spa railway station is the principal station serving the city of Bath in South West England. Its three-letter station code is BTH.

The station is managed by Great Western Railway, who operate all trains at this station.

History

Bath Spa station was built in 1840 for the Great Western Railway by Brunel and is now a Grade II* listed building. Opened on 31 August 1840, the station was named Bath and was renamed Bath Spa in 1949 to distinguish it from  station, which did not have its name altered from Bath until 1951.

The station has wide spacing between the platforms because it was built with two broad gauge carriage sidings between the platform lines. The original station featured a hammerbeam roof that covered the area between the platforms, similar to that which still exists at  Bristol Temple Meads. However, Bath's roof was removed in 1897 when the station was remodelled with longer platforms.

A three-track goods shed was built immediately west of the station, to the north of the main track. In 1877 a goods depot was built about 500 metres to the west at Westmoreland and the goods shed was demolished for the station remodelling in 1897.

A footbridge leads from the rear of the station across the Avon, allowing direct access to the Widcombe area of the city. Open in 1862, the bridge was originally made from wood and tolled (known locally as Halfpenny Bridge). However, this original structure collapsed disastrously in 1877 with a number of deaths, and the present steel girder bridge was erected as a replacement later that same year.

Redevelopment 

Since privatisation Great Western Railway has managed Bath Spa. In 2005 the company obtained listed building consent for alterations to the building, including the installation of lifts to the platforms. Ticket barriers have also been installed.

Other developments started in 2011 to integrate the station with the new Bath bus station and SouthGate shopping centre, and redevelop some of the station car park and northern ramp into a restaurant complex at a cost of £12 million. There are plans to adapt some arches at the station to encourage retail use.

Bath Spa won awards for Best Medium-Sized Station and Overall Best Station at the 2013 International Station Awards.

The station was modified in April 2017 for the Great Western Main Line electrification project. Because of its listed status, the platform canopies could not be cut back to fit overhead electrification equipment on the alignment and so the platforms were widened so that future electrification masts could be installed between the tracks. (Electrification through the station was deferred in November 2016). The work provided a larger circulation area and reduced the gap between train and platform.

Other stations in Bath 

The only other open station in Bath is Oldfield Park, a small commuter station in a western suburb, with limited services to Bristol and to Bath Spa, and onward stations.

Former stations now closed in Bath were Green Park (the Midland terminus, whose overall roof and primary buildings survive, and which for part of its life was named "Bath Queen Square"), Bathampton and Weston (a suburban station on the Midland line which closed in 1953). Westmoreland Road was a GWR goods station. Twerton-on-Avon, and Hampton Row Halt, both on the GWR route, closed in 1917 as a World War I economy measure.

Services

All services at Bath Spa are operated by Great western Railway.

These provide links to many smaller stations along these lines.

References

External links

 Slow motion video of Bath Spa

Railway stations in Bath, Somerset
DfT Category C1 stations
Former Great Western Railway stations
Railway stations in Great Britain opened in 1840
Railway stations served by Great Western Railway
Grade II* listed buildings in Bath, Somerset
Grade II* listed railway stations
Great Western Main Line
Isambard Kingdom Brunel railway stations